The Libyan Coast Guard is the coast guard of Libya. Organizationally part of the Libyan Navy, it operates as a proxy force of the European Union (EU) in order to prevent migrants from reaching the EU's borders. As of 2015, the Libyan Coast Guard consists of over 1,000 personnel. Since 2015, it has received $455 million in funding from the EU. The Libyan Coast Guard is involved in human trafficking, enslavement, torture, and other human rights violations.

History

The foundation of the Libyan Coast Guard dates back to 1970 when the previously separate customs and harbor police were joined in a single command within the Libyan Navy and under the Ministry of Defense. In 2006–2008 the Coast Guard fleet was renewed and equipped with 'stealth'  cruising speed PV30-LS patrol boats from the Croatian shipyard Adria-Mar. In 2017 the coast guard were criticised for failing to respond to ten vessels in distress.

During the 2015 European migrant crisis, the Libyan Coast Guard intercepted refugee and migrant boats travelling across the Mediterranean Sea, per a funding agreement reached with Frontex, the European border agency. The interceptions have been criticised as "worsening the crisis" and in November 2021 were reported to result in 27,500 people being returned to detention centres.

In May 2021, Salvatore Quinci, the mayor Mazaro del Vallo reported the second recent incident where fishermen were shot at by the coast guard, the later incident non fatality injuring one man. In July 2021 the Libyan Coast Guard was criticised for chasing and then shooting at a migrant boat.

Later in July 2021, a former senior Libyan police officer accused the coast guard of robbing people, and of being people smugglers. In November 2021, the coast guard threatened the German humanitarian vessel Sea Watch 4.

See also
 Detention centres in Libya
 Port security
 Maritime security regime
 Frontex

References

External links
 Libyan Coast Guard page on the Libya Observer

Libyan Navy
Coast guards
1970 establishments in Africa
Organizations based in Tripoli, Libya